The Johor Bahru District is a district located in the southern part of Johor, Malaysia. The district capital is Johor Bahru City and the administrative capital is Iskandar Puteri City. The district borders Pontian District on the west, Kota Tinggi District on the east, Kulai District on the north and Straits of Johor to the south. The urban centres are divided into the cities of Johor Bahru, Iskandar Puteri and Pasir Gudang.

It is host to many thriving townships such as the Tebrau area, which hosts several shopping malls including a ÆON Mall, Tesco, Toppen Shopping Centre and an IKEA outlet.

The district office is located in Johor Bahru.

Administrative divisions
Johor Bahru District is divided into 7 mukims, which are:。

Cities and Towns

There are two towns (Bandar) in Johor Bahru District.

Demographics

Government

The district is highly urbanized have been divided and delegated to the three local governments with Johor Bahru City as the capital of Johor Bahru District, which are:

Johor Bahru City Council

The Johor Bahru City Council (MBJB) governs the city centre of Johor Bahru. It also exercises jurisdiction includes Larkin, Tebrau, Ulu Tiram, Bandar Dato Onn, Kempas, Tampoi, Johor Jaya, Permas Jaya and partly Taman Rinting.

Iskandar Puteri City Council

The Iskandar Puteri City Council (MBIP) administers the area of the city of Iskandar Puteri which includes Skudai, Gelang Patah, Taman Perling, Kangkar Pulai, Tanjung Kupang and Tanjung Pelepas.

Pasir Gudang City Council

The Pasir Gudang City Council (MBPG) governs the eastern parts of the district with the populated areas such as Pasir Gudang, Masai, Bandar, Seri Alam, Taman Kota Masai, Kong Kong and Sungai Tiram.

Other Towns 
 Skudai
 Masai
 Pandan
 Plentong
 Gelang Patah
 Tampoi
 Ulu Tiram
 Kempas
 Kangkar Pulai
 Ulu Choh

Federal Parliament and State Assembly Seats

List of Johor Bahru district representatives in the Federal Parliament (Dewan Rakyat) 

List of Johor Bahru district representatives in the State Legislative Assembly (Dewan Undangan Negeri)

Economy
The main economy activities in the district are international trading, manufacturing, medical and healthcare.

Education
There are a total of 41 secondary schools, one religious school, three vocational schools, one technical secondary school and one fully residential school.

Transportation

Rail

The district has two railway stations, which are Johor Bahru Sentral and Kempas Baru.

Road
The Johor Bahru Eastern Dispersal Link Expressway, Pasir Gudang Highway, Johor Bahru East Coast Highway, Iskandar Coastal Highway, Skudai–Pontian Highway, Skudai Highway, Johor Bahru–Kota Tinggi Highway and Senai–Desaru Expressway links most of the cities and towns in Johor Bahru District. The district is linked to other districts in Johor and other states in Peninsular Malaysia via the North–South Expressway.

Singapore
The district is also linked to Singapore via Johor–Singapore Causeway and Malaysia–Singapore Second Link.

Sea
Ports in the district are Johor Port, Tanjung Langsat Port and Port of Tanjung Pelepas.

References

External links